Wellington High School is a co-educational (since 1905) secondary school in the CBD of Wellington, New Zealand. In 2005 the roll was approximately 1100 students. It was founded in the 1880s as the Wellington College of Design (later the Wellington Technical School) to provide a more appropriate education for the Dominion than the narrow academic training provided by the existing schools. It is the first co-educational secondary in New Zealand. It is one of only two secondary-level schools in Wellington (along with Onslow College), and one of only a few New Zealand secondary schools that does not have a school uniform.

Many of the current buildings date from the 1980s and are in the neo-brutalist style pyramidal roofs.

Wellington High School, and the institutions from which the current school evolved, have a significant place in the history of public education in New Zealand.

History

Wellington College of Design and Wellington Technical School 
What is now Wellington High School was founded in 1886 by Arthur Dewhurst Riley as the Wellington College of Design. It was the first technical school in New Zealand, the students were teenagers who had entered the workforce after primary school and the classes were trade focused and in the evenings. Students paid a fee's to attend. 

In 1891 the school became Wellington Technical School and it moved to its present site on Taranaki Street from Mercer Street in 1922. Riley was a pioneer of technical and vocational education in New Zealand and his views influenced the Manual and Technical Instruction Act of 1900.

Wellington Polytechnic 
In 1964 the secondary and tertiary education parts separated, the upper part becoming Wellington Polytechnical School. Wellington Poly has now become Massey University's Wellington Campus. Other technical schools have also gone on to become tertiary institutions, including Auckland University of Technology and Nelson Marlborough Institute of Technology.

Wellington High School 
The secondary school retains a large community education programme.

In 2014, an additional Māori name was chosen to sit alongside the established and venerable name of Wellington High School; "Te Kura Tuarua o Taraika ki Pukeahu".  Māori language students were deeply involved in the planning and implementation of the additional name. Taraika is the name of the school Marae.  Pukeahu is the area of land on which the school stands. The students presented their idea to the school’s whānau group, Te Whānau a Taraika and the school’s Board of Trustees as well as consultation undertaken with Taranaki Whānui ki Te Upoko o te Ika te mana whenua.  The additional name was formally adopted at the school's annual Whakanuia celebration in October 2014.

Current affairs

The School was New Zealand Trade and Enterprise Export Awards Education Exporter of the Year 2004.

In 2004, the school made the national headlines when students campaigned for the eviction of the Wellington branch of the Destiny Church, which was using the school hall for its services, with over 50% of enrolled students signing their names to a petition. 

In 2006, in response to research on Wellington High students, and an award-winning student video, Principal Prue Kelly introduced a scheme which allows senior students' first classes to begin at 10:20am (as opposed to 8:45am). This issue has received much media coverage, and generated very little controversy. Principal Prue Kelly was confident that this progressive trial in timetable restructuring would "catch on" and other schools would begin to adopt it as well. 
As well as the senior 10 o'clock  start, all years receive a late start on Wednesdays.

In 2016, Wellington High became the first school in Wellington to provide gender-neutral toilets. WHS converted one floor's separate single sex bathrooms to two sets of gender-neutral bathrooms. The urinals were removed from the boys' bathrooms, and bins added. Signage simply says 'bathroom.' There was a lot of media surrounding the change, and WHS released a media release requesting that the media accept the privacy of students, writing that they are now "getting on with the business of learning." Later in 2016, Onslow College converted a block of their toilets to gender-neutral.

Radio station
The school had a student-run radio station, LiveWire, which transmitted at 107.1. It had a range of approximately 4 km. The radio station ceased broadcasting at the end of 2007. In February 2011, the radio station was revived as High-Fi FM. It is operated by students from the school. The radio station still has the same specifications of a 4 km broadcast range and runs 24/7 on 107.3FM.

Board of Trustees

The Wellington High School board consists of eleven appointed and elected members. It is currently chaired by Belinda Rynhart.

Notable alumni

 Matt Benney ISO – civil servant and politician
 Ken Blackburn – actor, director
 Craig Bradshaw – sportsman, Tall Blacks and Winthrop University
 Luke Buda – musician, Phoenix Foundation
 Samuel Flynn Scott – musician, Phoenix Foundation
 Ben Hazlewood – Singer
 Timothy Hyde – magician and writer
 Eddie Johnston – musician, Race Banyon and Lontalius
 King Kapisi – musician
 Helen Kelly – President of the New Zealand Council of Trade Unions
 Paul Eagle – Former Deputy Mayor of Wellington City, MP for Rongotai. 
 Tom Larkin – musician, Shihad
 Sir Peter Leitch – The Mad Butcher
 Len Lye – artist, attended evening art classes at Wellington Technical College (now Wellington High School)
 Willy Moon – Singer and former X Factor New Zealand judge
 Nigel Priestley ONZM – earthquake engineer, professor at University of California 
 Chelsie Preston Crayford – actress
 James Shaw – Male co-leader of New Zealand's Green Party
 Maud Winifred Sherwood – artist
 Eric Tindill – sportsman, double All Black – cricket and rugby
 Grant Tilly – actor, Downstage Theatre, Unity Theatre, films and television
 Jon Toogood – musician, Shihad
 Sir Jon Trimmer KNZM – ballet dancer
 Roland Wakelin – artist regarded as a founder of modern art movement in Australia
 Dan Weekes-Hannah – actor
 Tandi Wright – actress, Shortland Street and Out of the Blue
 Solo Tohi – Part of the Australian/ NZ break dance crew Justice Crew that won 2010 Australia's Got Talent
Eva McGauley (1999–2018) – Activist, founder and CEO of www.Evaswish.com. Established an online charity for those who are victims of sexual harm

References

Sources
 Noel Harrison, The school that Riley built: The story of the Wellington Technical College from 1886 to the present day (ASIN: B0007JSZJ2): The history of Wellington Technical College up to 1961.

External links

Educational institutions established in 1886
Secondary schools in the Wellington Region
Schools in Wellington City
1886 establishments in New Zealand